Joel Baden (born 1 February 1996) is an Australian high jumper. A member of Australia's track and field squad at the 2015 IAAF World Championships and 2016 Summer Olympics, he cleared an extraordinary 2.29-metre mark twice as his personal best at the 2014 junior national meet in Melbourne, and at the North Queensland Games in Cairns two months before his maiden Games. Baden currently trains for the University of Melbourne's athletics club under the tutelage of his coach and mentor Sandro Bisetto.

At the 2016 Summer Olympics in Rio de Janeiro, Baden competed for Australia, along with his fellow countryman Brandon Starc, in the men's high jump. Booking a berth on the nation's track and field team for the Games, Baden jumped a height of 2.29 metres to match his personal best that he set two years earlier in Melbourne and to attain the IAAF Olympic entry standard at the North Queensland Games in Cairns. During the qualifying phase, Baden entered a height of 2.17 at his second attempt, but he could not trump the 2.20-metre barrier with all three failing attempts, ending his campaign quickly in a forty-first-place tie with Israel's Dmitry Kroyter.

Competition record

References

External links
 
 Joel Baden at Australian Athletics Historical Results 
 
 Australian 2016 Olympic Team Profile
 
 
 
 

1996 births
Living people
Australian male high jumpers
Athletes from Melbourne
World Athletics Championships athletes for Australia
Athletes (track and field) at the 2016 Summer Olympics
Olympic athletes of Australia
Athletes (track and field) at the 2018 Commonwealth Games
Australian Athletics Championships winners
Commonwealth Games competitors for Australia